Robert Allan Sneddon (born May 31, 1944) is a Canadian retired professional ice hockey player. He played in five games with the California Golden Seals during the 1970–71 NHL season.

Career statistics

Regular season and playoffs

External links

1944 births
Anglophone Quebec people
Baltimore Clippers players
Binghamton Dusters players
California Golden Seals players
Canadian ice hockey goaltenders
Dallas Black Hawks players
Ice hockey people from Montreal
Living people
Muskegon Zephyrs players
Portland Buckaroos players
Port Huron Flags players
Providence Reds players
Quebec Aces (AHL) players
Rochester Americans players
St. Catharines Black Hawks players
Seattle Totems (WHL) players
Springfield Kings players
Tidewater Wings players